This is an incomplete list of ambassadors from Germany to France.

Diplomatic missions

In 1874, the Embassy in Paris was one of only four Germany embassies alongside London, Saint Petersburg, and Vienna, Today, of 226 diplomatic missions abroad, Germany has five diplomatic and consular missions in France. The German Embassy is in Paris. In 1961, France returned the Hôtel de Beauharnais, the former German embassy in Paris which had been expropriated by France at the end of World War II, as a gesture of solidarity between the two nations. Additionally, there are four consulates-general in Bordeaux, Lyon, Marseille and Strasbourg.

The Hôtel de Beauharnais in the 7th arrondissement of Paris serves as the official residence of the German Ambassador to France.

Ambassadors

Ambassadors of the German Empire
 1871–1873: Harry von Arnim
 1874–1885: Chlodwig, Prince of Hohenlohe-Schillingsfürst
 1885–1900: Georg Herbert Münster
 1900–1910: Hugo von Radolin
 1910–1914: Wilhelm von Schoen

Ambassadors of the Weimar Republic 
1920–1923: Wilhelm Mayer
 1924–1932: Leopold von Hoesch

Ambassadors of Nazi Germany 

1933–1935: Roland Köster
 1936–1939: Johannes von Welczeck
 1940–1944: Otto Abetz

Ambassadors of the German Democratic Republic
 1956–1962: Herbert Merkel
 1962–1962: Herbert Schulze
 1963–1967: Willi Diebenkorn
 1967–1973: Gerhard Schramm
 1973–1974: Gerhard Schramm
 1974–1976: Ernst Scholz
 1976–1984: Werner Fleck
 1984–1990: Alfred Marter

Ambassadors of the Federal Republic of Germany

West Germany
 1950–1955: Wilhelm Hausenstein 
 1955–1958: Vollrath von Maltzan
 1963–1965: Herbert Blankenhorn
 1965–1968: Manfred Klaiber
 1968–1970: Sigismund von Braun
 1970–1972: Hans Hellmuth Ruete
 1972–1976: Sigismund von Braun
 1976–1983: Axel Herbst
 1983–1987: Franz Jochen Schoeller
 1987–1991: Franz Pfeffer

Post-German reunification

 1991–1995: Jürgen Sudhoff
 1995–1998: Immo Stabreit
 1998–2000: Peter Hartmann
 2000–2004: Fritjof von Nordenskjöld
 2004–2007: Klaus Neubert
 2007–2008: Peter Ammon 
 2008–2012: Reinhard Schäfers
 2012–2015: Susanne Wasum-Rainer 
 2015–2020: Nikolaus Meyer-Landrut
 2020–date: Hans-Dieter Lucas

Envoys from the German States (before 1871)

Baden envoys

 1791: Establishment of diplomatic relations
 1713–1734: Johann Rudolf Fäsch
 1761–1762: Ulrich von Thun
 1772–1781: Pierre Samuel du Pont de Nemours
 1781–1782: Giorgio di Santi
 1783–1789: Pierre Samuel du Pont de Nemours
 1789–1803:
 1803–1809: Emmerich Joseph von Dalberg
 1810–1831: Johann Baptist von Pfirdt
 1831–1843: Christian Friedrich Gerstlacher
 1843–1846: Franz Xaver von Andlaw-Birseck
 1846–1871: Ferdinand Allesina von Schweitzer

Bavarian envoys

Envoys from the Electorate of Bavaria

 1666: Establishment of diplomatic relations
 1733–1736: Louis Joseph d’Albert de Luynes von Grimbergen
 1737–1741: Ignaz von Törring
 1741–1742: Louis Joseph d’Albert de Luynes von Grimbergen
 1742–1743: von Spon
 1743–1745: Joseph Piosasque de Non 
 1745–1747: Louis Joseph d’Albert de Luynes von Grimbergen
 1747–1755: 
 1755–1777: Maximilian von Eyck 
 1778–1787: Karl Heinrich Joseph von Sickingen
 1787–1799: Vacant
 1799–1805: Anton von Cetto

Envoys of the Kingdom of Bavaria

 1806–1813: Anton von Cetto
 1813-1817: No relations
 1817–1821: Wilibald von Rechberg and Rothenlöwen 
 1821-1823: Vacant
 1823–1827: Franz Gabriel von Bray-Steinburg
 1827–1834: Christian Hubert von Pfeffel
 1835–1839: Franz Oliver von Jenison-Walworth 
 1840–1846: Friedrich von Luxburg 
 1846–1847: Ludwig von Oettingen-Wallerstein
 1847-1850: Vacant
 1850–1866: August von Wendland
 1866–1868: Maximilian Joseph Pergler von Perglas
 1868–1871: Friedrich von Quadt-Wykradt-Isny
 1871–1877: Gideon von Rudhart 
 1877–1889: Johann von Reither
 1889–1896: Heinrich Tucher von Simmelsdorf 
 1896–1903: Rudolph von und zu der Tann-Rathsamhausen 
 1903–1903: Georg von und zu Guttenberg 
 1903–1906: Karl Moy de Sons
 1906–1909: Friedrich von Ortenburg
 1909–1914: Lothar von Ritter zu Groenesteyn 
 1914: End of diplomatic relations

Hanseatic envoys

 1689–1717: Christophle Brosseau
 1717–1727: Jacques de Cagny
 1727–1729: Antoine Poille
 1730–1776: Luc Courchetet d’Esnans
 1776–1785: Louis d’Hugie
 1785–1786: Jean Diodati
 1786–1793: Michel-Alexis Fauvet de La Flotte
 1795–1803: Friedrich Joachim Schlüter
 1803–1810: Konrad Christoph Abel
 1810–1814: No relations while the Hanseatic cities belonged to the Holy Roman Empire.
 1814–1823: Konrad Christoph Abel
 1824–1864: Vincent Rumpff
 1864–1870: Hermann von Heeren

Prussian envoys

Envoys from the Elector of Brandenburg
 1648: Establishment of diplomatic relations
 1626–1649: Abraham de Wicquefort
 1658: Christoph von Brandt

Ambassadors of the King of Prussia

 1716–1717: Adam Otto von Viereck
 1717–1719: Friedrich Ernst zu Innhausen und Knyphausen
 1721–1751: Jean de Chambrier
 1751–1754: George Keith
 1754–1756: Dodo Heinrich zu Innhausen und Knyphausen
 1756–1763: None due to the Seven Years' War
 1768–1792: Wilhelm Bernhard von der Goltz
 1792: Break in relations due to French Revolutionary Wars
 1815–1822: Karl von der Goltz			
 1824–1837: Heinrich von Werther
 1841–1845: Heinrich Friedrich von Arnim
 1846–1848: Heinrich Alexander von Arnim
 1849–1859: Maximilian von Hatzfeldt-Trachenberg
 1859–1861: Albert von Pourtalès
 1862–1862: Otto von Bismarck
 1862–1868: Robert Heinrich Ludwig von der Goltz

Ambassadors of the North German Confederation

 1868–1869: Robert von der Goltz
 1869–1870: Karl von Werther

Saxon envoys

Envoys from the Electorate of Saxony
 1664:  Establishment of diplomatic relations
 1709–1720: Burchard von Suhm 
 1720–1729: Carl Heinrich von Hoym
 1729–1734: Samuel de Brais
 1735–1737: Vacant
 1737–1741: Samuel de Brais
 1741–1753: Johann Adolph von Loß 
 1753–1754: Samuel Gottfried Spinnhirn
 1754–1755: Claude Marie Noyel Bellegarde d'Entremont
 1755–1757: Ludwig Siegfried Vitzthum von Eckstädt
 1757–1768: Kaspar Franz von Fontenay 
 1768–1770:
 1770–1772: Johann Georg Heinrich von Werthern

Envoys from the Kingdom of Saxony
 1815–1827: Carl Emil von Üchtritz
 1827–1828: Georg Rudolf von Gersdorff
 1828–1849: Hans Heinrich von Könneritz
 1850–1852: Karl Adolf von Hohenthal-Knauthain 
 1853–1870: Albin Leo von Seebach 
 1870–1871: Vacant

Württemberg envoys
 1650: Establishment of diplomatic relations
 1814–1815: Ferdinand Ludwig von Zeppelin
 1815–1817: R. von Schwarz
 1817–1820: Peter von Gallatin
 1821–1838: Bernhard von Mülinen
 1838–1849: Christian Wilhelm August von Fleischmann
 1849–1850: Vacant
 1850–1871: August von Wächter

See also
France–Germany relations
Lists of ambassadors of Germany

References

France
Germany